"Endless Love" is a song written by Lionel Richie and originally recorded as a duet between Richie and pop icon singer/actress Diana Ross. In this ballad, the singers declare their "endless love" for one another. It was covered by Luther Vandross with fellow R&B singer Mariah Carey and also by country music singer Shania Twain. Richie's friend (and sometimes co-worker) Kenny Rogers has also recorded the song. Billboard has named the original version as the greatest song duet of all time.

About the record
Ross and Richie recorded the song for Motown, and it was used as the theme for Franco Zeffirelli's film adaptation of Scott Spencer's novel Endless Love. (Jamie Bernstein, as the character Susan, sings the song during the course of the movie.) Produced by Richie and arranged by Gene Page, it was released as a single from the film's soundtrack in 1981. While the film Endless Love was a modest box-office success, the song became the second-biggest selling single of the year (first was "Bette Davis Eyes" by Kim Carnes) in the United States and reached number one on the Hot 100, where it stayed for nine weeks from August 15 to October 10, 1981. It also topped the Billboard R&B chart and the Adult Contemporary chart, and reached number seven in the United Kingdom. It also became the most successful duet of the rock era, surpassing the Everly Brothers' 1957 hit "Wake Up Little Susie", which spent four weeks at number one. Both songs spent six months on the chart, with "Endless Love" eclipsing the Everlys' hit by one week.

Record World called it a "super ballad" that is "overflowing with drama and tenderness."

The soulful composition became the biggest-selling single of Ross' career, and her 18th and final career number-one single in the USA (including her work with the Supremes). It is also Richie's best-charting single, and the first of several hits for him during the 1980s. The song was nominated for an Academy Award for Best Original Song for Richie, and was the second song with which Ross was involved that was nominated for an Oscar. It also won a 1982 American Music Award for Favorite Pop/Rock Single. Ross recorded a solo version of the song for her first RCA Records album, Why Do Fools Fall in Love, the duet version being her last hit on Motown. Richie's solo version was released as track 10 on the 2003 remastered bonus edition of his 1982 album.

Charts

Weekly charts

Year-end charts

All-time charts

Certifications

Credits 
 Lionel Richie – lead vocals, vocal arrangements
 Diana Ross – lead vocals
 Reginald "Sonny" Burke – Fender Rhodes
 Barnaby Finch – acoustic piano
 Paul Jackson Jr. – electric guitar, acoustic guitar solo 
 Fred Tackett – guitar
 Nathan East – bass guitar
 Rick Shlosser – drums
 Gene Page – horn, rhythm and string arrangements
 Harry Bluestone – concertmaster

Luther Vandross and Mariah Carey version

Walter Afanasieff produced Luther Vandross and Mariah Carey's cover of the song for Vandross' album Songs (1994), and it is known for being Carey's first "high-profile" duet (an earlier duet, "I'll Be There", was with the then-unknown background singer Trey Lorenz). At the 1995 Grammy Awards, the song was nominated in the new category of Best Pop Collaboration with Vocals, losing to "Funny How Time Slips Away" by Al Green and Lyle Lovett. Columbia Records later included the song on Carey's compilation album Greatest Hits (2001) and then again on her next compilation album, The Ballads (2008). It was released as the second single on August 29, 1994, from Songs.

Recording
Sony Music Entertainment President Tommy Mottola suggested that Vandross record Songs, an album of cover versions. Featuring Vandross' versions of songs like Stephen Stills' "Love the One You're With", Heatwave's "Always and Forever", and Roberta Flack's "Killing Me Softly", the album was shaping up to be a major career accomplishment. To give the album a bigger boost, Mottola's then-wife, Mariah Carey, came up with the idea to remake "Endless Love" as a duet with her. Lionel Richie and Diana Ross had originally recorded "Endless Love" in 1981, and the song spent nine weeks at number 1. Although Luther's album was already set to contain one Lionel Richie composition, "Hello", it was obvious that having the most-popular female artist on the Sony label singing on the album would be a benefit.

Critical reception
AllMusic senior editor Stephen Thomas Erlewine highlighted the track. Larry Flick from Billboard noted that it is "framed with beautiful, swelling strings (how 'bout those harps and rolling drums at the song's climax!)." He added, "Carey is at her most colorful and effective here, fluttering around Vandross' distinctive phrasing with ease and agility." Steve Baltin from Cash Box deemed it "a guaranteed smash." He explained further, "The passionate song is the perfect vehicle for their emotive singing styles. In addition, they know not to argue with success, staying true to the original." Entertainment Weeklys Jeremy Helligar wrote that the album might very will give Vandross a number one hit with "Endless Love" but still called the song "drippy." A reviewer from Music & Media commented, "A compliment should go out to the casting director, who brought together two partners of equal magnitude to render the plush duet Diana Ross & Lionel Richie made famous." Alan Jones from Music Week gave it four out of five, adding that the song "finds Vandross and Carey singing around each other, rather than with each other". He noted further, "They do so against a backing track that is almost identical to the original, and the result will be identical too – a Top 10 hit."

Commercial performance
On the US Billboard Hot 100, "Endless Love" debuted on September 10, 1994, at number 31 and peaked at number two. The song became Luther Vandross' highest-charting pop hit ever and gave Lionel Richie his first top-10 single as a songwriter in seven years. It became Vandross's fifth top-10 single and Carey's 12th. It remained in the top 40 for 13 weeks and was ranked number 56 on the Hot 100 1994 year-end chart. It was certified Platinum by the Recording Industry Association of America (RIAA).

The song was a success outside the United States, reaching the top of the chart in New Zealand (for five weeks) and the top five in the United Kingdom, Australia, Ireland, and the Netherlands. It also reached the top 20 in most of the countries. It was certified Platinum in Australia by the Australian Recording Industry Association (ARUA) and in New Zealand by the Recording Industry Association of New Zealand (RIANZ). Sales in the United Kingdom stand at 230,000.

Music video
Two music videos were released for the single; one features Carey and Vandross recording the song in a studio, and the other shows the two performing the song live at Royal Albert Hall. The latter performance is included on the Luther Vandross: From Luther with Love music video collection in DVD format.

Track listings
 7-inch single
 "Endless Love" – 4:21
 "Endless Love" (instrumental) – 4:22

 Japanese mini-CD single
 "Endless Love" – 4:21
 "Endless Love" (Mariah only) – 4:22
 "Endless Love" (Luther only) – 4:22
 "Endless Love" (instrumental) – 4:22

 UK and European CD maxi single
 "Endless Love" – 4:21
 "Endless Love" (instrumental) – 4:22
 "Never Too Much (live) – 5:00
 "Any Love" (live) – 5:22
 "She Won't Talk to Me" (live) – 5:14

Personnel
 Luther Vandross, Mariah Carey: vocals
 Lionel Richie: songwriter
 Walter Afanasieff: producer, arranger, orchestrator, keyboards, piano, drum programming, Minimoog bass, Fairlight acoustic bass, Synclavier acoustic guitar, programming
 Dan Shea: keyboards, synthesizer programming, MacIntosh programming
 Ren Klyce: Akai AX60, Roland Juno-106 & Synclavier programming
 Gary Cirimelli: Synclavier programming
 Dann Huff: acoustic guitar, electric guitar and nylon guitar solo
 The London Symphony Orchestra: orchestra
 Jeremy Lubbock: orchestrator, conductor

Charts and certifications

Weekly charts

Year-end charts

Certifications and sales

Release history

Lionel Richie and Shania Twain version

Lionel Richie re-recorded the song in 2011 as a duet with Canadian country pop singer Shania Twain. It was released as the lead single from his album Tuskegee on February 7, 2012. The recording process of the song was documented in the final episode of Twain's reality docudrama series, Why Not? with Shania Twain, which aired on June 12, 2011.

Music video
A music video for the song was recorded in The Bahamas in February 2012. Directed by Paul Boyd, the video was released to country music channels CMT and GAC on March 23, 2012.

Charts

Weekly charts

Year-end charts

See also
 List of Billboard Hot 100 number-one singles of 1981
 List of number-one R&B singles of 1981 (U.S.)

References

External links
 List of cover versions of "Endless Love" at SecondHandSongs.com
 

1980s ballads
1981 singles
1994 singles
2012 singles
Diana Ross songs
Lionel Richie songs
Luther Vandross songs
Mariah Carey songs
Shania Twain songs
Billboard Hot 100 number-one singles
Cashbox number-one singles
Number-one singles in Australia
RPM Top Singles number-one singles
Number-one singles in New Zealand
Number-one singles in South Africa
Songs written for films
Songs written by Lionel Richie
Pop ballads
Contemporary R&B ballads
Male–female vocal duets
1981 songs
Motown singles
Epic Records singles
Columbia Records singles
Sony Music singles
Universal Music Group singles
Music videos directed by Paul Boyd